Sultana Muhammad Fetih 1453 ( The Conquest 1453) is a 2012 Turkish epic action film directed by Faruk Aksoy and produced by Faruk Aksoy, Servet Aksoy and Ayşe Germen. Starring Devrim Evin, İbrahim Çelikkol and Dilek Serbest, the film is based on events surrounding the Fall of Constantinople to the Ottoman Turks during the reign of Sultan Mehmed II.

Plot
The film opens in Medina during the time of the Islamic prophet Muhammad, 627 AD. Abu Ayyub tells other sahabas that Constantinople will be conquered by a blessed commander and army.

The story shifts abruptly to the 15th century. Sultan Muhammad al-Fatih was given the throne by his father Murad II when he was 12; he learns of his father's death while governing the Sanjak of Saruhan. This causes him much grief and paves the way for his ascension to the throne again, after the death of his brother Fathıl IV. When Sultan Mehmet had first ascended the throne, he was also 12 years old. Murad II, suffocated by the political hostility of his margraves and viziers, relinquished the throne due to the impact of his deep grief caused by his beloved son Mohamed's death and enthroned Mehmet. Grand Vizier Halil Pasha, who had a great influence on the Janissaries and the state, was dissatisfied because of this situation. He was especially troubled with Sultan Mehmet indicating that Constantinople's conquest is vitally essential. He made Sultan Murat inherit the throne again in anticipation of the possibility of crusaders occupying Ottoman territories by taking advantage of Mehmet. Mehmet was suspended from the throne and sent to the Sanjak of Saruhan.

Now, Mehmet succeeds to the throne again and is even more powerful. His priority target is still the conquest of Constantinople. He gains inspiration from the words of Muhammad: “Constantinople will surely be conquered. What a blessed commander is its and what a blessed army is its army.”

He works out everything that will take him to the target. At the outset, Mehmet decides that he should live in peace with contiguous countries  until he makes the preparations for his campaign. He sends messengers to the Papal States, to the Kingdom of Hungary, to the Serbian Despotate, to the Kingdom of Poland, to the Republic of Genoa and to the Republic of Venice and notifies them of his intention to live in peace. He restores the dockyard of Gallipoli and because of this action, 100 galleys can be produced there in a year. Meanwhile, the Byzantine Emperor Constantine XI Palaiologos thinks that Sultan Mehmet is inexperienced and lacking in foresight.  Constantine demands heavy appropriations, trying to use to his advantage his possession of the captive Prince Orhan. Constantine's main intention is to make Sultan Mehmet lose his reputation by capitulating to his demands. Sultan Mehmet appears to accept his demands, but this is just a strategy of deceit.

As soon as the news of Karaman's rebellion is received, Ottoman armies set out for Akşehir. Karamanoğlu İbrahim was not expecting such a mighty army. He demands peace. Sultan Mehmet accepts the peace, because he does not want his armies to be harmed unnecessarily. After the military expedition, on the return journey, a group of janissaries confront the state tent and ask for payment. They had not actually engaged in battle. In response, Sultan Mehmet sends out enthronements. He also sends into exile the janissary master Kurtçu Doğan. The janissary was an ally of Grand Vizier Halil Pasha. With this incident, Mehmet properly gains dominion over his armies.

Following his return to Adrianople, Mehmet sends a messenger to Emperor Constantine and he declares that he will no longer send the subsidy for the continued captivity of Orhan. Following this incident, Mehmet starts to build the Boğazkesen (Rumelian) Fortress across the Anatolian Fortress. He fully intends to wage war against the Byzantine Empire.

On 29 May 1453, the Byzantine soldiers on the ramparts are overwhelmed while facing Sultan Mehmet and his army.

Cast

Production
The production costs of the film are not well-known. The film was produced over a period of three years and cost an estimated $17 million. Other sources claim that the actual cost of the film is US$8 million. A Turkish journalist Ali Eyuboglu asked budget to producer and producer claimed that they never stated any budget to press. In addition to this, another co-producer commented to Ali Eyuboglu that 4 million ticket will be afford expenses for the film. In Turkey profit to producer is estimated $2 per ticket, so the film should cost no more than $8 million. It is still the most expensive film in Turkish cinema history. The film trailer itself took one and a half months to complete and cost $600,000. The trailer was viewed by over 1.5 million people within 24 hours of its release.
The size of the full cast was extensive; the film reportedly required the use of 16,000 extras.

Release
Fetih 1453 was released on 15 February 2012 at 14:53 local time. The film was released in different countries on 16 February 2012, including United States, the United Kingdom, France, Egypt, United Arab Emirates, Bosnia-Herzegovina, Kazakhstan, Uzbekistan, Germany, the Netherlands, Macedonia, Kyrgyzstan, Azerbaijan, Tajikistan, Bangladesh, South Korea, Japan and several others. Universal Studios have expressed an interest in acquiring the distribution rights to the film. The film was released on Blu-ray October 2, 2012.

Prior to its release, the film caused outrage in Greece, with many accusing it of being racist and obscuring historical facts, while the Greek Proto Thema newspaper called it "a conquest propaganda by the Turks".

Reception

Box office
It sold 1.4 million tickets on its first weekend and 2.23 million tickets in its first week of release. In 18 days, it surpassed Recep İvedik 2 to become the most watched film ever in Turkey.  As of 13 May 2012, it has sold 6,468,777 tickets in Turkish cinemas.

Critical reactions
Turkish Prime Minister Recep Tayyip Erdoğan, who watched a special advance screening, liked the film very much.

Historical accuracy 
The film only depicts the ethnically Turkish element of the Ottoman army. In reality, the Ottoman army was very diverse, including many Balkan converts to Islam as well as Christian levies and the armies of the Sultan's Christian and Muslim vassals. The Ottoman Empire also engaged in a series of conquests in the previous decade, subjugating the Serbian Despotate and defeating Hungary at the Battle of Varna. The Eastern Roman Empire by 1450 was a shadow of its former self, having shrunk to a few square kilometers outside of Constantinople itself. The city was impoverished and depopulated, and by 1453 consisted of a series of walled villages separated by vast fields surrounded by the 1000 year old Theodosian walls. Eastern Roman Emperor Constantine XI rejected Ottoman overtures to surrender, fearing a massacre by Turkish forces. The final capture of the city also omits the day of pillaging that Mehmed allowed his soldiers, with Mehmed simply sparing the inhabitants instead.

See also
 List of Islamic films
 Fall of Constantinople
 Mehmed the Conqueror
 Turkish nationalism

References

External links
 
 
 
 

2012 films
2012 war drama films
Fiction set in 1453
War films based on actual events
Films set in the 7th century
Films set in the 1450s
Films set in the Byzantine Empire
Films set in Istanbul
Films set in the Ottoman Empire
Films set in Saudi Arabia
Films scored by Benjamin Wallfisch
Turkish war drama films
2010s historical action films
Biographical films about royalty
Siege films
Fall of Constantinople
Cultural depictions of Mehmed the Conqueror
Biographical action films
Historical action films
Historical epic films
Films about Islam
Turkish epic films